List of Taoists is a list of some historical figures in Taoism.

Classical 
 Laozi (601 BCE–531 BCE) (Founder of Philosophical Taoism)
 Wenzi (c. 5th century BCE)
 Lie Yukou (Liezi) (c. 400 BCE)
 Zhuang Zi (Chuang Tzu) (c. 4th century BCE)
 Guiguzi (c. 2nd century BCE)
 Yang Xiong (53 BCE–18)
 Maming Sheng (c. 100)
 Yin Changsheng (120–210)
 Wei Boyang (151–221)
 Ge Xuan (164–244)
 Zhang Jiao (d. 184)
 Gan Ji (d. 200)
 He Yan (195–249)
 Ji Kang (223–262)
 Zhang Daoling (Zhang Ling) (c. 2nd century)
 Zhongli Quan (c. 2nd century) (Legendary figure)
 Zhang Lu (d. 216)
 Wang Bi (226–249)
 Guo Xiang (Kuo Hsiang) (252–312)
 Fan Changsheng (d. 318)
 Bao Jing (d. 330)
 Wei Huacun (252–334)
 Ge Hong (284–364)
 Pao Ching-yen (c. 3rd century)
 Bao Gu (c. 4th century)
 Kou Qianzhi (365–448)
 Lu Xiujing (406–477)
 Ge Chaofu (c. 4th or 5th century)
 Tao Hongjing (456–536)
 Sun Simiao (d. 682)
 Li Bi (722–789)
 Lü Dongbin (c. 750–)
 Du Guangting (850–933)
 Chen Tuan (871–989)
 Wang Chongyang (1113–1170)
 Sun Bu'er (1119–1182)
 Wang Chuyi (1142–1217)
 Qiu Chuji (1148–1227)
 Zhang Sanfeng (b. 12th century) (Legendary figure)
 Zhang Sicheng (d. 1344)
 Zhang Guoxiang (d. 1611)
 Liu Yiming (1734–1821)

Modern 
 Moy Lin-shin (1931–1998)
 Shi Zhouren (1934–2021)
 Wang Liping (born 1949)
 Wu Chengzhen (born 1957)

See also 
Taoism
Daodejing
Taoist schools
List of people by belief

References 

Taoists
 
Taoists
Taoists